Verret is a surname. Notable people with the surname include:

Claude Verret (born 1963), Canadian ice hockey player
Douglas P. Verret, American physicist and magazine editor
Joe Verret (1945–2010), American communist

See also
Verret, New Brunswick, community in Canada
Verrett (disambiguation)